The Jefferson Township Public Schools is a comprehensive community public school district, serving students in kindergarten through twelfth grade from Jefferson Township, in Morris County, New Jersey, United States.

As of the 2018–19 school year, the district, comprising seven schools, had an enrollment of 2,926 students and 267.5 classroom teachers (on an FTE basis), for a student–teacher ratio of 10.9:1.

The district is classified by the New Jersey Department of Education as being in District Factor Group "GH", the third-highest of eight groupings. District Factor Groups organize districts statewide to allow comparison by common socioeconomic characteristics of the local districts. From lowest socioeconomic status to highest, the categories are A, B, CD, DE, FG, GH, I and J.

Schools
Schools in the district (with 2018–19 enrollment data from the National Center for Education Statistics) are:
Elementary schools
Milton School with 175 students in grades PreK-K
Karl Mundi, Principal
Ellen T. Briggs School with 278 students in grades K-2
Dr. Michael Valenti, Principal
Cozy Lake School with 173 students in grades 1-2
Karl Mundi, Principal
Arthur T. Stanlick School with 280 students in grades 3-5
Kevin Lipton, Principal
White Rock Elementary School with 325 students in grades 3-5
Randi DeBrito, Principal
Middle school
Jefferson Township Middle School with 728 students in grades 6-8
Dr. Kelly Cooke, Principal
High school
Jefferson Township High School with 937 students in grades 9-12
Dr. Timothy Plotts, Principal

Administration
Core members of the district's administration include:
Jeanne Howe, Superintendent of Schools
Rita Oroho-Giacchi, Business Administrator / Board Secretary

Board of education
The district's board of education, with nine members, sets policy and oversees the fiscal and educational operation of the district through its administration. As a Type II school district, the board's trustees are elected directly by voters to serve three-year terms of office on a staggered basis, with three seats up for election each year held (since 2012) as part of the November general election. The board appoints a superintendent to oversee the day-to-day operation of the district.

References

External links
Jefferson Township Public Schools

School Data for the Jefferson Township Public Schools, National Center for Education Statistics

Jefferson Township, New Jersey
New Jersey District Factor Group GH
School districts in Morris County, New Jersey